Rolando Rivero Rivero (born 2 September 1944) is a Mexican politician affiliated with the National Action Party. As of 2014 he served as Deputy of the LX Legislature of the Mexican Congress representing Coahuila.

References

1944 births
Living people
Politicians from Coahuila
National Action Party (Mexico) politicians
21st-century Mexican politicians
Deputies of the LX Legislature of Mexico
Members of the Chamber of Deputies (Mexico) for Coahuila